Kim Da-hyun (born May 28, 1998), known mononymously as Dahyun, is a South Korean singer and rapper. She is a member of the South Korean girl group Twice, formed by JYP Entertainment in 2015.

Life and career

Dahyun was born in Seongnam, Gyeonggi, on May 28, 1998. She grew up with her parents and has an older brother. At a young age, she began singing with her Christian church choir. Dahyun first gained attention in sixth grade in elementary school with a dance at church called the "eagle dance", which was posted on YouTube. Dahyun was recruited to become a trainee for JYP Entertainment after a talent scout saw her performance at a dance festival, and she subsequently trained with them for over three years.

In 2015, Dahyun competed in Sixteen, a reality television show to determine the members of JYP Entertainment's new girl group. One of the nine successful participants, Dahyun was subsequently selected to join Twice as a singer and rapper. In October that year, she officially debuted with Twice with the release of their extended play (EP), The Story Begins, and the lead single "Like Ooh-Ahh".

Dahyun graduated from Hanlim Multi Art School in 2017. That year, in Gallup Korea's annual music poll, she was voted the seventeenth most popular idol in South Korea.

In November 2018, Dahyun was criticized by right-wing Japanese lawmaker Masaru Onodera for wearing a T-shirt made by Marymond, an organization that raises funds for helping comfort women, victims of sexual slavery by the Imperial Japanese Army during World War II. In the aftermath, The Korea Times criticized J. Y. Park, founder of JYP Entertainment, for failing to speak up in her defense.

Endorsements
In March 2021, Dahyun and bandmate Sana were selected as the models for skincare brand A'pieu. In April 2022, Dahyun renewed her contract with A'pieu until 2024.

Discography

Songwriting credits
All song credits are adapted from the Korea Music Copyright Association's database unless stated otherwise.

Filmography

Television shows

Web Drama

Bibliography

Photobooks

References

External links
 

1998 births
Living people
JYP Entertainment artists
Japanese-language singers of South Korea
English-language singers from South Korea
South Korean women rappers
South Korean female idols
South Korean women pop singers
Twice (group) members
Hanlim Multi Art School alumni
21st-century South Korean women singers
South Korean television personalities
People from Seongnam